Glencoe High School may refer to:

Glencoe High School (Alabama), Glencoe, Alabama
Glencoe High School (Minnesota), Glencoe, Minnesota
Glencoe High School (Oklahoma), Glencoe, Oklahoma
Glencoe High School (Hillsboro, Oregon), Hillsboro, Oregon
Glencoe District High School, Glencoe, Ontario